Peter Vanessa "Troy" Davies (1960–2007), sometimes known as Ecco Homo or Vanessa, was an Australian artist, singer, and musician.

Career
Under the stage name of Ecco Homo, he signed a record deal with RooArt. He released two singles, "Motorcycle Baby" and "New York, New York". The video clip of the former featured Michael Hutchence and the latter featured Bono and The Edge.  Producers and musicians who worked on the singles include Ollie Olsen, Gus Till, Michael Sheridan, Bill McDonald (all from Max Q) and Big Pig's Sherine Abeyratne.

In 2015 the film Ecco Homo, directed by Richard Lowenstein and Lynn-Maree Milburn, was released. It documented Davies' life and career. The film features interviews with people who knew him including Bono, Hutchence and Kriv Stenders.

Discography
"Motorcycle Baby" (1988) - RooArt Aus #66
"New York, New York" (1990) - RooArt

References

Australian musicians
2007 deaths
1960 births
Place of birth missing